Lisa Opie MBE (born on 15 August 1963) is a retired British squash player, who was one of the game's leading woman players in the 1980s and early-1990s. Her biggest successes were winning the British Open in 1991 and four consecutive World Team Championships from 1985 to 1990. Until the rise of Cassie Campion she was England's number 1 player.

Born and raised in Guernsey, she was coached in her early years in the game by Reg Harbour. In international competition, she represented England. She was appointed MBE for services to squash in the 1995 New Year's Honours List. In later years she was coached by Gavin Dupre from Jersey. They began working together in Guernsey and Lisa later spent time training with him in Germany where he was based as a professional coach.

Playing career
Lisa won her first tournament in 1979 and quickly established herself as one of the game's best players. She reached the 1981 World Open semi-final but lost to Rhonda Thorne 9–2, 9–0, 9–4. This was to be the first in a series of near-misses for Lisa, as she reached two World Open finals but lost both times to the New Zealand squash legend Susan Devoy – in 1985 (9–4, 9–5, 10–8) and 1987 (9–3, 10–8, 9–2).

The British Open also provided much heartbreak. In 1982 and 1983 she lost in the final against Vicki Cardwell, and then against old foe Devoy again in 1984 (5–9, 9–0, 9–7, 9–1) and 1986 (9–4, 9–2, 9–3). However, she eventually won the British Open in 1991 when she beat compatriot Sue Wright in the final 6–9, 9–3, 9–3, 9–4. This made her the first British woman to win the title for 30 years. That same year she finished second in the Sports Journalists Award, with the athlete Liz McColgan coming first.

World Open

Finals: 2 (0 title, 2 runners-up)

British Open

Finals: 5 (1 title, 4 runners-up)

World Team Championships

Finals: 6 (4 titles, 2 runner-up)

References

External links
 

English female squash players
Guernsey sportswomen
1963 births
Living people
Guernsey squash players
Members of the Order of the British Empire